Ma Buluan (1905–1969) was a Ma Clique general in the National Revolutionary Army, and a relative of Ma Bufang, the governor of Qinghai. He fought in the Second Sino-Japanese War and in the Chinese Civil War during the Heshui Campaign, Meridian Ridge Campaign, Ningxia Campaign. His rank was Major General.

References

Hui people
1905 births
1969 deaths
Ma clique
National Revolutionary Army generals
Warlords in Republican China
Chinese anti-communists